Étienne Padery (born Athens, ca. 1674) was an Ottoman-born Greek, who served as a translator to the French embassy in Constantinople, and later as a French consul to the Safavid Empire.

Sources
 
 
 
 

Greeks from the Ottoman Empire
Ambassadors of France to Safavid Iran
1670s births
18th-century deaths

Year of birth uncertain
Year of death unknown
Greek translators
French translators
Diplomats from Athens